The former Communauté de communes du Petit Caux  was located in the Seine-Maritime département of the Normandy region of north-western France. It was created in January 2002. It was disbanded on 1 January 2016 when its member communes merged into the new commune Petit-Caux.

Participants 
The Communauté de communes comprised the following communes:

Assigny 
Auquemesnil
Belleville-sur-Mer
Berneval-le-Grand
Biville-sur-Mer
Bracquemont
Brunville
Derchigny
Glicourt
Gouchaupre
Greny
Guilmécourt
Intraville
Penly
Saint-Martin-en-Campagne
Saint-Quentin-au-Bosc
Tocqueville-sur-Eu
Tourville-la-Chapelle

See also
Communes of the Seine-Maritime department

References 

Petit Caux